Xava Tashaeva  is a popular young Chechen pop singer. She has a wide fan base, but appeals mainly to teenagers and young adults. She is the daughter of the Russian singer-bardess Marem Taşaeva.

She is also friends with many other Chechen pop singers, including Makka Sagaipova, Ilyas Ayubov, and (before she died) Milana Balaeva.

Xava Tashaeva is notable for her experimentation with various genres. She also, nonetheless, also produces various traditional Chechen folk music songs.

Discography
Xava released her first album, Bezaman Laman, in 2006. It has 14 tracks:

Track 01. Bezam Hu Yu
Track 02. Michah Yu Bexke
Track 03. Homenig
Track 04. Satiysar
Track 05. Sedarchiy Soh Ma Deliysha
Track 06. Rechka Detstva
Track 07. Jarja Bjargash
Track 08. Mavila Bexkaza
Track 09. Berhiyta Sho
Track 10. Beralla
Track 11. Tsha Minot
Track 12. Aganan Yish
Track 13. So Yagjara Hitja
Track 14. Kavkaz

See also
 Maryam Tashaeva
 Makka Sagaipova
 Chechen pop

External links
- Xava as a young child already performing with her mother at a party
- Xava performing a melancholy song in concert
- Xava performing for Ramzan Kadyrov at a party in his palace

References

Year of birth missing (living people)
Living people
Chechen women singers
Chechen pop singers
Russian women singers
Russian pop singers
Russian people of Chechen descent
Chechen people